Strike Force may refer to:

Arts, entertainment, and media

Games
Strike Force (video game), a 1991 arcade game
Commandos: Strike Force, a 2006 video game
Dynasty Warriors: Strikeforce, a 2009 video game
Marvel Strike Force, a 2018 video game

Television
Strike Force (TV series), a 1981 ABC television series starring Robert Stack
"Strike Force" (Gotham), an episode of Gotham
 Strike Force (1975 film), a 1975 television film

Other uses in arts, entertainment, and media
Strike Force, a 2003 film also known as The Librarians
Strikeforce: Morituri, a science fiction comic published by Marvel Comics
Strikeforce (comics), a 2019 comic series published by Marvel Comics

Sports
Strike Force (professional wrestling), a professional wrestling tag team
Strikeforce (mixed martial arts), a defunct mixed martial arts promotion
Strikeforce: Young Guns

See also
 Force de frappe (Strike Force), the French nuclear deterrent
 Quick reaction force
 Strike Team (disambiguation)
 Theatre Strike Force, a college improvisation troupe